Felixstowe School is a secondary school and sixth form with academy status, located in Felixstowe, Suffolk, England.

The school was formed in September 2011 from the merger of Orwell High School and Deben High School. Formerly, the school operated from both of these school sites, before all pupils were later accommodated by the recently constructed new buildings at the former Orwell High School site, with the old Deben High School premise being closed. Felixstowe School’s new buildings cost approximately £19 million, and were officially opened for teaching on Monday 28 April 2014.

The school was previously sponsored by AET but from September 2019, it was taken over by a local Suffolk trust, Unity Schools Partnership, who sponsor a number of successful schools across the county.

The school offers further education (FE) courses, primarily at A Level, but also several specialised vocational courses.

In 2017, the school received an 'inadequate' rating from Ofsted.

History
Orwell High School was a medium size secondary community school with Specialist Technology College status.

In 2006 the school was issued with a notice to improve.  There was a subsequent inspection in 2007 in which the school was seen to be making "satisfactory progress" and therefore the notice to improve was revoked. In 2010 51% of Orwell candidates gained five GCSEs at grades A* to C including English and Maths. In October 2009 OFSTED stated that the school was satisfactory, but Leadership and Management and the Capacity to Improve were both good.

In September 2009 the school became a foundation school supported by the charitable Felixstowe Learning Trust.

The Executive Headteacher, Robert Cawley, started at the school in 2010. The previous Headteacher, Peter Tomkins resigned from his post in May 2010.  A statement from John Barker, the Chair of Governors, thanked Peter for his hard work and dedication.

In September 2011 the school was formally merged with Deben High School, to form Felixstowe Academy. Following concerns over the leadership and management of the Academy, the previous Academy Trust was given Notice to Terminate. They ceased to have control in September 2019. The school is now sponsored by the Unity Schools Partnership.

Notable former pupils

Deben High School
 Prof Paul Boyle, Vice-Chancellor since 2014 of the University of Leicester, Chief Executive from 2010-14 of the Economic and Social Research Council (ESRC), and Professor of Human Geography from 1999-2010 at the University of St Andrews, President from 2011-14 of Science Europe and from 2007-09 of the British Society for Population Studies

Felixstowe Grammar School
 David Mann, Chief Executive from 1987-94 of Logica, and President from 1994-95 of the British Computer Society (BCS)
 Sir Mervyn Pedelty Chief Executive from 1997-2004 of The Co-operative Bank
 Christopher Strauli, actor, father

References

External links
Felixstowe School Website

Secondary schools in Suffolk
Academies in Suffolk
Academies Enterprise Trust
Felixstowe